Pygurus is a genus of sea urchins belonging to the family Clypeidae.

Fossil record
This genus is known in the fossil record from the Jurassic (Bajocian age)  to Cretaceous Santonian age) (age range: from about 164.7 to 94.3 million years ago). Fossils of species within this genus have been found in Egypt, France, Portugal, Saudi Arabia, Switzerland, Ukraine, the United Arab Emirates, Chile, Germany, India, Madagascar, Poland, Saudi Arabia, Tunisia and United States.

Species
Species within this genus include: 
Pygurus andinus Larrain and Biró-Bagóczky 1985
Pygurus asiaticus Tokunaga 1903
Pygurus complanatus Tanaka 1965
Pygurus lampas de la Beche 1833
Pygurus montmollini Agassiz 1836
Pygurus noetlingi De Loriol 1899
Pygurus tenuis Agassiz & Desor, 1847 
Pygurus yamamaensis Kier 1972

References 

Clypeasteroida